Operation Archery, also known as the Måløy Raid, was a British Combined Operations raid during World War II against German positions on the island of Vågsøy, Norway, on 27 December 1941.

British Commandos of No. 3 Commando, two troops of No. 2 Commando, a medical detachment of No. 4 Commando, a demolition party from 101 Troop (canoe) of No. 6 Commando, and a dozen Norwegians from Norwegian Independent Company 1 conducted the raid. The submarine  was in support as the force navigational check.  and  transported the troops. Also in support were Royal Air Force bombers and fighter-bombers.

Objectives
Central to the operation was the destruction of fish-oil production and stores which the Germans used in the manufacture of high explosives. Another intention was to cause the Germans to maintain and increase forces in Norway, which would reduce forces deployed on the Eastern Front, thereby giving a numerical advantage to Allied forces.

The commando force of 570 troops was divided into five parties to
 Secure the area north of the town of Måløy in South Vågsøy and engage any enemy reinforcements
 Subdue and secure Måløy town
 Eliminate the enemy on Måløy Island which dominated the town
 Eliminate the enemy strongpoint at Holvik west of Måløy
 Provide a floating reserve offshore

Raid
The dawn landing was preceded by a very effective naval bombardment and objectives were achieved, except in Måløy. German opposition in the town was much stiffer than expected as, unknown to the British, a Gebirgsjäger (mountain troops) unit of experienced troops from the Eastern Front was there on leave. The defenders' experience in sniping and street fighting caused the operation to develop into a bitter house-to-house battle. The British commander, John Durnford-Slater, called on the floating reserve and troops from Vågsøy Island. Several local citizens assisted the commandos by acting as porters for ammunition, grenades and other explosives and in carrying away the wounded.

At around 14:00, the commandos started their withdrawal having destroyed four factories, the fish-oil stores, ammunition and fuel stores, the telephone exchange and various military installations, leaving much of the town in flames. The naval assault force of one cruiser and four destroyers had sunk 10 vessels, some found in the act of being scuttled to prevent capture. Technical difficulties had prevented the German coastal artillery from being fully effective, with one of their three  guns scoring one hit on the cruiser.

Aftermath
No Royal Navy ships were lost but the navy suffered four men killed and four wounded. The Commandos sustained 17 killed and 53 wounded. The commander of the Norwegian Independent Company 1, Captain Martin Linge, was killed in an attack on the local German headquarters and eight Royal Air Force aircraft were shot down. (A Norwegian civilian was hit by shrapnel during the raid, and died from the resulting injuries the following night). The commandos accounted for at least 120 defenders killed and returned with 98 prisoners and a complete copy of the German Naval Code. Captain O'Flaherty was hit by sniper fire and lost an eye, later wearing an eye-patch as a brigadier. Capt O'Flaherty can be seen in the image of 'Wounded British Soldier' being helped by two fellow soldiers. The soldier with bayonet is Derek Page of No 3 Commando.

Several Quislings and over 70 loyal Norwegians (Jøssing) were also brought back. In conjunction with this raid, Operation Anklet was mounted by No. 12 Commando on the Lofoten Islands as a diversion. The raid was enough to persuade Adolf Hitler to divert 30,000 troops to Norway and to build more coastal and inland defences. Hitler thought that the British might invade northern Norway to put pressure on Sweden and Finland.

Notes

Further reading

External links

 "SUPPLEMENT to The London Gazette Of FRIDAY the 2nd of July 1948 RAID ON MILITARY AND ECONOMIC OBJECTIVES IN THE VICINITY OF VAAGSO ISLAND. ibiblio.org
 Combined Operations: Operation Archery
 I Was There! – We Went to Vaagso with the Commando Men, The War Illustrated, 20 January 1942.
 Newsreel coverage of the raid

Conflicts in 1941
World War II British Commando raids
Battles and operations of World War II involving Norway
Military history of Norway during World War II
1941 in Norway
Norwegian resistance movement
Military operations of World War II involving Germany
History of Vestland
Articles containing video clips
Amphibious operations of World War II
December 1941 events
Amphibious operations involving the United Kingdom